Kent Andrew Simpson (born July 20, 1975) is a Canadian professional ice hockey winger and current broadcaster, who most recently played for Rødovre Mighty Bulls in the Danish Oddset Ligaen. Simpson currently serves as a hockey commentator for BBC during Winter Olympic ice hockey coverage.

He has previously played in the East Coast Hockey League (ECHL) in North America and also played in Europe in the British Ice Hockey Superleague (ISL), the German Deutsche Eishockey Liga (DEL) and the Italian Serie A. He also spent the 1999–2000 season with the touring Canadian national ice hockey team.

Simpson is the younger brother of former National Hockey League player Todd Simpson.

Playing career
After finishing university, Simpson joined the Johnstown Chiefs in the ECHL for the 1998–99 season before spending a season touring with the Canadian national ice hockey team. Simpson then went to Europe where he joined the Sheffield Steelers in the British ISL for the 2000–01 season when he helped them to win a Grand Slam of all available trophies: the Benson & Hedges Cup, the Challenge Cup, the league championship and the playoffs. Simpson then played the 2001–02 season playing for Schwenninger Wild Wings in the DEL before returning to Sheffield for the 2002–03 season. During this second spell with Sheffield he helped them to win the Challenge Cup and the league championship.

In 2003–04, Simpson played for Renon Ritten in the Italian Serie A before he moved to Herning Blue Fox in the Danish Oddset Ligaen for the 2004–05 season. Next, Simpson returned to Sheffield, who were then playing in the Elite Ice Hockey League, for the 2005–06 season and for his third spell with them. Simpson then returned to Denmark to play for Rødovre Mighty Bulls for the 2006–07 season.

Records
Most assists (17) and points (26) for Sheffield Steelers in 2002–03.
Most goals (26) and points (50 – jointly held) for Renon Ritten in 2003–04.

Career statistics

International play
Played for Canada in:
1999–2000 touring team

International statistics

References
European Hockey.Net
The Internet Hockey Database

External links
 

1975 births
Living people
Herning Blue Fox players
Canadian ice hockey left wingers
Ice hockey people from British Columbia
Johnstown Chiefs players
Rødovre Mighty Bulls players
Schwenninger Wild Wings players
Sheffield Steelers players
Ritten Sport players
University of Alberta alumni
Canadian expatriate ice hockey players in England
Canadian expatriate ice hockey players in Denmark
Canadian expatriate ice hockey players in Italy
Canadian expatriate ice hockey players in Germany
Canadian expatriate ice hockey players in the United States